Anton Glinkin (born 28 October 1988) is a Russian professional ice hockey forward who is currently an unrestricted free agent. He most recently played for HC Kunlun Red Star of the Kontinental Hockey League (KHL). He has formerly played with Traktor Chelyabinsk and Ak Bars Kazan.

Awards and honours

References

External links

1988 births
Living people
Ak Bars Kazan players
HC Kunlun Red Star players
Russian ice hockey forwards
Traktor Chelyabinsk players
Sportspeople from Chelyabinsk